Pultenaea radiata is a species of flowering plant in the family Fabaceae and is endemic to the south-west of Western Australia. It is an erect, open shrub with linear, needle-shaped, grooved leaves, and clusters of red and pinkish-purple flowers.

Description
Flowering occurs from September to October and the fruit is a flattened pod.

Taxonomy and naming
Pultenaea radiata was first formally described in 1921 by Herbert Bennett Williamson in the Proceedings of the Royal Society of Victoria. The specific epithet (radiata) means "radiating outwards", apparently referring to the leaves.

Distribution
This pultenaea is found in the Jarrah Forest, Swan Coastal Plain and Warren biogeographic regions of south-western Western Australia.

Conservation status
Pultenaea radiata is classified as "not threatened" by the Government of Western Australia Department of Parks and Wildlife.

References

radiata
Eudicots of Western Australia
Plants described in 1921